Aravinnd Singh is an Indian cinematographer and a Film producer who works in the Tamil film industry. He made a breakthrough with his cinematography work in Demonte Colony (2015).

Early life and education
Aravind was born in Chennai to a family who were into the construction business in Vellore, where he grew up and then eventually completing his higher schooling in Chennai from Latha Rajinikanth's The Ashram International school with A Levels in Psychology and Sociology. He is a B.Sc. Visual communication graduate from SRM Institute of Science and Technology. Upon graduation, he went on to specialize in filmmaking with a post-graduate degree from Whistling Woods international in Mumbai. His academic performance resulted in him being selected for the student exchange program involving a semester-long course in Griffith University in Brisbane, Australia where he studied Film Direction, Editing, and Sound Design.

Career 
After graduating from Whistling woods international and Griffith University, he assisted cinematographer Santosh Sivan in the films Urumi and Thuppakki. His debut feature film Demonte Colony went on to be a huge commercial and critical success. An article in Times of India about his work noted, "The film takes place over the course of two days and the entire second half takes place inside a single room but with the help of his cinematographer, Aravinnd Singh, Ajay manages to keep the film visually appealing — the orange glow of a streetlight in the background provides a stark contrast to the saturated tone that is used for the room and the interesting angles in which the cinematographer frames the action (a must in a horror film) adds to the thrill". Meanwhile, Sify cites "cinematographer Aravinnd Singh has done a phenomenal job as he conveys all the thrill moments through his lighting and angles. The aerial shot showcasing the housing board colony and the vivid lighting used in the SINGLE ROOM of the protagonists' house are absolutely brilliant".

His second film, Aarathu Sinam was a Tamil remake of Jeethu Joseph's Malayalam film Memories. It was directed by Arivazhagan Venkatachalam and starred Arulnidhi and Aishwarya Rajesh. Upon release the movie was widely appreciated with Hindustan Times quoting "Aarathu Sinam is a taut thriller like the original, Memories. It sails through a thrilling terrain to a wow climax." Behindwoods - "Aravinnd Singh's cinematography is fast and elegant. His navigation shot of Madurai in a sequence towards the end of the movie, the long encounter sequence in a construction site in the beginning  and certain establishment shots are the work of a creatively superior technician." IB Times - "Technically, cinematography department is top notch." Rediff - "The film is, however, technically sound with some intriguing camera angles by cinematographer Aravind Singh." DNA - "Most of the shots by the cinematographer Aravind Singh (like the kids running in the paddy field) are visually quite appealing too."

His recent releases Natpe Thunai turned out to be highly successful at the box office and K-13 commercially successful as well as critically acclaimed. His other upcoming Tamil films include titled Shaitan Ka Bachcha., Cadaver, a forensic thriller starring Amala Paul in the lead  and 'Diary' starring Arulnithi written and Directed by Innasi has previously assisted director Ajay Gnanamuthu 

Aravinnd Singh turned producer for Arulnithi's untitled film under his production house 'MNM films', this untitled project is directed by popular YouTube channel Eruma Saani Vijay in Ron Ethan Yohann's music.

Filmography

References

Sources
,

External links 

Artists from Chennai
Tamil film cinematographers
People from Vellore
Indian Tamil people
Griffith University alumni
Cinematographers from Tamil Nadu